Count Jean Bruno Wladimir François-de-Paule Lefèvre d'Ormesson (16 June 1925 – 5 December 2017) was a French writer and novelist. He authored forty books, was the director of Le Figaro from 1974 to 1977, as well as the dean of the Académie Française, to which he was elected in 1973, until his death, in addition to his service as president of the International Council for Philosophy and Humanistic Studies within UNESCO (1992–1997).

Early life
Jean d'Ormesson was born on 16 June 1925 in Paris into an aristocratic family; he was a count. His father, André Lefèvre, Marquis of Ormesson, was the French ambassador to Brazil.

D'Ormesson grew up in Bavaria, Romania and Brazil. He also spent time at the Château de Saint-Fargeau. He was raised as a Roman Catholic, and later called himself a secular Catholic, but not an atheist.

D'Ormesson attended preparatory school at the Lycée Henri-IV, and he was admitted to the École normale supérieure; he subsequently passed the agrégation in Philosophy.

Career
D'Ormesson was the author of more than forty books, including novels and plays. His first novels, L'amour est un plaisir, Un amour pour rien, Les illusions de la mer, were unsuccessful. However, his La gloire de l'Empire won the Grand Prix du roman from the Académie française in 1971. His next novel, Au plaisir de Dieu, was made into a television film. His work was published in Bibliothèque de la Pléiade in 2015, while he was still alive.

D'Ormesson became Secretary-General of the International Council for Philosophy and Humanistic Studies at UNESCO, and the director of the conservative French newspaper Le Figaro from 1974 to 1979. D'Ormesson self-identified as conservative.

On 18 October 1973, d'Ormesson was elected a member of the Académie française, taking seat 12, following the death of Jules Romains, in 1973. On the death of Claude Lévi-Strauss on 30 October 2009, he became the Dean of the Académie, its longest-serving member.

D'Ormesson was a Grand Cross of the Legion of Honour, and an officer of the National Order of Merit. In 2010, he was awarded the Ovid Prize, Romania, in recognition of his body of work.

Personal life and death
D'Ormesson married Françoise Béghin in 1962. They had a daughter, Héloïse, an editor.

On 5 December 2017, d'Ormesson died in Neuilly-sur-Seine, at the age of 92. A national tribute was paid on 8 December 2017 in Les Invalides, where French President Emmanuel Macron gave a speech; former presidents Nicolas Sarkozy and François Hollande were also in attendance.

Bibliography 

 L'Amour est un plaisir (1956)
 Du côté de chez Jean (1959)
 Un amour pour rien (1960)
 Au revoir et merci (1966)
 Les Illusions de la mer (1968)
 La Gloire de l'Empire (1971) – Grand Prix du roman de l'Académie française
 Au plaisir de Dieu (1974)
 Le Vagabond qui passe sous une ombrelle trouée (1978)
 Dieu, sa vie, son œuvre (1981)
 Mon dernier rêve sera pour vous (1982)
 Jean qui grogne et Jean qui rit (1984)
 Le Vent du soir (1985)
 Tous les hommes en sont fous (1985)
 Le Bonheur à San Miniato (1987)
 Album Chateaubriand (1988) – Bibliothèque de la Pléiade
 Garçon de quoi écrire (with François Sudreau, 1989)
 Histoire du juif errant (Wandering Jew story) (1991)
 Tant que vous penserez à moi (with Emmanuel Berl, 1992)
 La Douane de mer (1994)
 Presque rien sur presque tout (1995)
 Casimir mène la grande vie (1997)
 Une autre histoire de la littérature française (vol. I, 1997 & vol. II, 1998)
 Le Rapport Gabriel (1999)
 Voyez comme on danse (2001)
 C'était bien (2003)
 Et toi, mon cœur, pourquoi bats-tu? (2003)
 Une fête en larmes (2005)
 La Création du monde (2006)
 Odeur du temps (2007)
 Qu'ai-je donc fait (2008)
 L'enfant qui attendait un train (2009)
 Saveur du temps (2009)
 C'est une chose étrange à la fin que le monde (2010)
 Un jour je m'en irai sans en avoir tout dit (2013)
 Comme un chant d'espérance (2014)
 Dieu, les affaires et nous (2015)
 Je dirai malgré tout que cette vie fut belle (2016) – Prix Jean-Jacques-Rousseau
 Le guide des égarés (2016)
 Et moi, je vis toujours (2018)
 Un Hosanna sans fin (2018)

Filmography 
 2012 : Les saveurs du Palais (also known as Haute Cuisine) as Le Président, directed by Christian Vincent
 2018 : Michel Déon ou la force de l'amitié directed by Jérémie Carboni (documentary)

References

External links 

List of novels by Jean d'Ormesson on the Académie française web site.

1925 births
2017 deaths
Writers from Paris
20th-century French journalists
21st-century French journalists
20th-century French novelists
21st-century French novelists
Counts of France
French columnists
Members of the Académie Française
École Normale Supérieure alumni
Grand Officiers of the Légion d'honneur
Grand Croix of the Légion d'honneur
Officers of the Ordre national du Mérite
Grand Prix du roman de l'Académie française winners
Grand prix Jean Giono recipients
Lycée Henri-IV alumni
French male novelists
20th-century French male writers
21st-century French male writers
French male non-fiction writers
Le Figaro people